Morrissey College of Arts & Sciences (MCAS) is the oldest and largest constituent college of Boston College, situated on the university's main campus in Chestnut Hill, Massachusetts. Founded in 1863, it offers undergraduate and graduate programs in the humanities, social science, and natural sciences.

In the tradition of liberal arts education, the college offers 37 programs leading to bachelor's, master's and doctoral degrees. Enrollment includes more than 6,000 undergraduate and nearly 800 graduate students.

Morrissey College has produced many distinguished alumni, including renowned scholars, high-ranking politicians and influential business leaders. It is consistently ranked among the best national and Roman Catholic (Jesuit) colleges.

History

Founded by the Society of Jesus and chartered by the Commonwealth of Massachusetts in 1863, Morrissey College is the original school of Boston College. Its charter provided that no student could be refused admission “on account of the religious opinions he may entertain.” Three Jesuit instructors and 22 students, all males mostly from Boston's marginalized Irish Catholic immigrant community, made up the college when it opened its doors on September 5, 1864. Robert Fulton, S.J., an alumnus of Georgetown University, served as Morrissey College's first dean and later president. Nine  students  received  A.B. degrees, the first bachelor's degrees awarded, in 1877.

Morrissey College was originally located in the block between Harrison Avenue and James Street in Boston's South End neighborhood. It shared quarters with its preparatory school, Boston College High School that became separately incorporated in 1927. By the turn of the century, the college had outgrown its urban setting and a new location was selected in mostly rural Chestnut Hill. The Boston firm of Maginnis and Walsh broke ground at the highest point of Chestnut Hill on June 19, 1909, for the construction of Gasson Hall. It was the first of several buildings designed in one of the earliest examples of collegiate gothic architecture in North America. Claver, Loyola, and Xavier were the first residential halls constructed on the university's upper campus in 1955.

Boston College remained an exclusively liberal arts institution, with emphasis on the Greek and Latin classics, English and modern languages, philosophy and religion, for the first several decades after its founding. In 1925, the Graduate School of Arts and Sciences was formed, followed by programs at the doctoral level in 1952, establishing Boston College's role as a leading research university.

In September 1933, Casper Augustus Ferguson enrolled in Morrissey College and four years later became the first black student to graduate from Boston College. By 1970 all Boston College undergraduate programs, including at Morrissey College, had become coeducational.

Stokes Hall, a humanities building that houses several arts and sciences departments, was completed in 2013. In 2015, the School of Arts & Sciences and Graduate School of Arts & Sciences were renamed Morrissey College of Arts & Sciences in honor of benefactor and alumnus Robert J. Morrissey, class of 1960.

Academics

Departments

 Art, art history, and film
 Biology
 Chemistry
 Classical studies
 Communication
 Computer science
 Earth and environmental sciences
 Economics
 English
 German studies
 History
 Mathematics
 Music
 Philosophy
 Physics
 Political science
 Psychology and neuroscience
 Romance languages and literatures
 Slavic & eastern languages and literatures
 Sociology
 Theatre
 Theology

Interdisciplinary programs

 African and African diaspora studies
 American studies
 Asian studies
 Asian American studies
 Biochemistry
 Environmental studies
 International studies
 Irish studies
 Islamic civilization and societies
 Jewish studies
 Latin American studies
 Medical humanities
 Women's and gender studies

References

External links
 College of Arts and Sciences Main Page

Boston College
University subdivisions in Massachusetts
1863 establishments in Massachusetts
Educational institutions established in 1863
Liberal arts colleges at universities in the United States